George Edwin King (October 8, 1839 – May 7, 1901) was a Canadian lawyer, politician, second and fourth premier of New Brunswick, and puisne justice of the Supreme Court of Canada.

King was born in Saint John, New Brunswick and attended Wesleyan University in Middletown, Connecticut, where he received a B.A. in 1859 and a M.A. in 1862. He then served under articles to a senior lawyer in Saint John, Robert Leonard Hazen, was made an attorney in 1863, and was called to the bar in 1865.

King was elected to the first provincial legislature of the new Canadian Confederation in 1867 and served in the Confederation Party government as minister without portfolio. When Andrew R. Wetmore resigned, the Confederation Party became the Liberal-Conservatives and King became Premier in 1870. At 30 years of age, King was the youngest person to assume the premier's office in New Brunswick history. Some members of King's caucus felt he was too close to the federal Conservatives of Sir John A. Macdonald and King was maneuvered out of the leadership by George L. Hathaway with King taking a position in the new cabinet. When Hathaway died in 1872, King became Premier for a second time serving until 1878.

One of King's major accomplishments was the Common Schools Act of 1871 which implemented a single, tax supported public school system.  As Attorney General, King appeared in the courts to defend the Act from constitutional challenges, including appearing before the Judicial Committee of the Privy Council, at that time the court of last resort for Canada within the British Empire, in the case of Maher v. Town Council of Portland, which upheld the Act.

In 1880 he became a justice of the province's supreme court, the Court of Queen's Bench of New Brunswick, and in 1893 he became a justice of the Supreme Court of Canada.

On his death in 1901, of a work-related heart attack, he was interred in the Fernhill Cemetery in Saint John, New Brunswick.

References 

 Supreme Court of Canada Biography

Government of New Brunswick profile of Premier King

1839 births
1901 deaths
Canadian Methodists
Wesleyan University alumni
Justices of the Supreme Court of Canada
Premiers of New Brunswick
Politicians from Saint John, New Brunswick
Burials in Canada